Leominster High School (also known as Leominster High or LHS) is a public high school located in Leominster, Massachusetts, United States. It is the only secondary educational institution found in Leominster. It is situated in a mixed-industrial-residential section of Western Leominster in a 1960s era building.

History 
The original site for Leominster High School was located at the Carter Building. Located on West Street in Leominster, this building served as the public high school from 1909 to 1963. It later served as a junior high school, and is currently vacant. The current location of Leominster High School, located at 122 Granite Street, was opened in the fall of 1963. It has since undergone major renovations, both in 1977 and 1990.

In 2018 Leominster High School, as well as all of Leominster Public Schools were subject to a major computer privacy breach, leading to student data being held hostage. In order to return the data, a $10,000 ransom was paid by the City of Leominster.

General information 
Leominster High School comprises two units. It has an academic unit and a trade school, which is known as the Center for Technological Educational innovation (abbreviated CTEi). The majority of students are enrolled in the academic unit, although CTEi participation has been growing in recent years. Collectively, these two units are referred to as Leominster High School. In 2002, LHS had an enrollment of 1802 students, including freshmen, sophomores, juniors, and seniors. LHS now has an enrollment of approximately 2,000 students.  Leominster currently offers 12 Advanced Placement courses, 21 Honors level courses, and 12 Vocational shops, far less than neighboring Fitchburg High School or Monty Tech, but more than many high schools in the area this has led to a decline in students in recent years as Fitchburg High's honors program attracts many top-tier students by school choice.  Leominster High is accredited by the New England Association of Colleges and Secondary Schools.

A common tradition for Leominster High School students to participate in is to vandalize a mural made by the rising seniors of Fitchburg High School, though this tradition in previous years was largely performed at thanksgiving, recently it has transferred towards the early summer. This transition, however, has recently led to the decline of a well-thought-out course of action, and generally poorer results.

Athletics 

Leominster High School is a participant in Massachusetts Interscholastic Athletic Association. Doyle Field, the school's sports complex located in downtown Leominster, underwent a major renovation from 2005 to 2006 though it still lacks adequate track and field facilities in order to host meets.  

In addition to football, the school offers cross country, field hockey, girls and boys soccer, volleyball, girls and boys basketball, ice hockey,  indoor track, outdoor track, girls and boys lacrosse, girls and boys tennis, softball, and baseball. Leominster High also is the home to the Marching Blue Devils. The band plays at all of the high school's home football games. They also perform at the city's patriotic events, including the Memorial Day and Veteran's Day ceremonies.

Most of Leominster's athletic teams play their home games at the high school itself or at the Doyle Field complex. The ice hockey team plays its home games in neighboring Fitchburg at the Wallace Civic Center.

Recent renovations have occurred at Doyle Field. The track is not being resurfaced and will be torn up in the next few years,  due to a heavy focus on football.  This will leave the Leominster High School track team, which already cannot have home meets because of the poor condition of the track, without a practice track.

Notable alumni 

 Herbert Reiner Jr., ('33) American diplomat, who captured Mahatma Gandhi's killer in New Delhi, India, in January 1948.
 James Nachtwey ('66) – Award-winning war photographer.
 R.A. Salvatore ('77) – Well-known science fiction novelist
 Mark Osowski ('81) – former NBA assistant coach for the New Orleans Hornets (then Charlotte Hornets), the Golden State Warriors, and the Cleveland Cavaliers.
 Markus Schulz ('87) – Music producer
 Keith Beauregard ('01) - baseball player
 Mark Daigneault ('03) – American basketball coach, currently the head coach of the Oklahoma City Thunder of the National Basketball Association.
 Paul DiGiovanni ('06) – Guitarist of the pop-punk band Boys Like Girls
 Frank Novak – American football coach
 Adrian Nicole LeBlanc – American journalist, recipient of the MacArthur Fellowship
 Matt Kelly – Drummer for the Dropkick Murphy’s
 Noah Gray - NFL tight end
 Al Spalding, naval architect

References

Schools in Worcester County, Massachusetts
Public high schools in Massachusetts
Educational institutions established in 1963
Buildings and structures in Leominster, Massachusetts
1963 establishments in Massachusetts